Lynton and Lynmouth, also known as Little Switzerland, is the scenic landscape in and around the villages of Lynton and Lynmouth in Devon, which resembles the landscapes of Switzerland. It includes the surrounding coast and countryside: Valley of Rocks, Watersmeet and Heddon Valley. The resemblance was popularised by the Romantic Movement poets Wordsworth, Coleridge, Shelley and Southey:

Southey had traveled to Lynton in 1799, journeying along the Exmoor coast via Porlock, and staying at one of Lynton's Inns. The poet's praise of Lynton and Lynmouth was used in publicity as the "English Switzerland" for the developing tourism industry, while his likening of the area to Switzerland sparked off a fashion for building in a Swiss style.

Lynton and Lynmouth were discovered in the early 1800s when the Napoleonic Wars closed the Continent to travelers; unable to make their Grand Tour of Europe due to the conflict, visitors to Lynton and Lynmouth found the area evocative of their earlier sojourns in the Alps en route to Italy.

The twin villages of Lynton and Lynmouth are situated on the heritage coast of Exmoor National Park in North Devon. 
Lynton stands above the harbour village of Lynmouth nestling beneath the cliffs to which it is connected by the water-powered funicular railway, Lynton and Lynmouth Cliff Railway.  

In 1952 it was the scene of the devastating Lynmouth flood when overnight over 100 buildings and 28 bridges were destroyed, 35 people died with a further 420 made homeless.  

The Lynton and Lynmouth area is now often referred to as the 'Walking Capital of Exmoor': "No wonder then, that the area is known as 'the walking capital of Exmoor!'" The South West Coast Path and Tarka Trail pass through, while the Two Moors Way, Samaritans Way South West and the Coleridge Way all finish there.
The twin villages are also the centre for the 21 Mile Drive figure of eight scenic route around Little Switzerland.

The civil parish was formerly called "Lynton" but was renamed to "Lynton and Lynmouth".

References

Further reading 
  

 
Exmoor
North Devon